Eva Vertes George (born 1985) is a Canadian Alzheimer's and cancer researcher and a resident physician in pathology at the  University of Florida College of Medicine, where she earned an M.D. degree after attending Princeton University as an undergraduate. She was recognized for her research when she was still a teenager. At 17, she discovered properties of a chemical compound, (RPI-069) which stopped the brain cells of fruit flies from dying. This is considered a step towards curing Alzheimer's. She won first prize at BASEF and the Intel International Science and Engineering Fair in Kentucky, and then finished her high school diploma by correspondence while continuing her research in Italy for a year, under a fellowship she was awarded. She is also recognized for her research which found a correlation between stem cells and brain cancer. This finding is the basis of her argument that cancer itself is the body's natural self-repair system in error. She is perhaps most visible due to her being on a PBS series on scientists, and speaking at the TED convention.

See also
 TED
 Stem cells
 Cancer
 Alzheimer's disease

References

 Eva Vertes' High School recognition

External links
 
 
 Inventor of the Week: Eva Vertes at MIT
 Eva Vertes CBC interview
 Biographical Article from The Rebelution, 2007
 Secret Life of Scientists: Eva Vertes on PBS, September 25, 2009
 University of Florida College of Medicine profile

Living people
1985 births
Princeton University alumni
University of Florida College of Medicine alumni
Cancer researchers